Olav Harald Jensen (1917–1991) was a Norwegian economist.

He was educated in business administration, and was hired in 1955 as a lecturer at the Norwegian School of Economics (NHH). He was a professor at Åbo Akademi University from 1958, before returning to NHH as a professor from 1960 to 1984. He served as rector there from 1973 to 1978.

He was the brother of Arne Jensen.

References

1917 births
1991 deaths
Academic staff of Åbo Akademi University
Academic staff of the Norwegian School of Economics
Rectors of the Norwegian School of Economics
20th-century Norwegian  economists